The Indianapolis Police Department (IPD) (September 1, 1854 – December 31, 2006) was the principal law enforcement agency of Indianapolis, Indiana, under the jurisdiction of the Mayor of Indianapolis and Director of Public Safety. Prior to the consolidation with the Law Enforcement Division of the Marion County Sheriff's Department to form the Indianapolis Metropolitan Police Department, 1,230 sworn police officers and 250 non-sworn personnel were employed by the department.

Organization 
At the time the agency was dissolved, the Indianapolis Police Department had 1,196 sworn police officers and 30 reserve police officers. At that time the agency was headed by Michael T. Spears, chief of police; Robert Turner, director of public safety; and Bart Peterson, mayor of Indianapolis.

Patrol districts 
 North District - Adam Sector - 4209 N College Ave.
 East District - Baker Sector - 3120 E 30th St.
 South District - Charles Sector - 1150 Shelby St.
 West District - David Sector - 551 N. King Ave.
 Downtown District - Edward Sector - 25 W 9th St.

Rank structure 
There were five police districts, each led by a deputy chief. Deputy chiefs reported to assistant chiefs, assistant chiefs reported to the chief of police, and the chief of police was subject to the authority of the mayor.

Police ranks

Uniform 
The first officers for the department were identified only by a silver star. The police were put into uniforms in July 1862, consisting of a dark blue coat, light blue trousers with a cord along the seam, and a blue cap.

Over the years the department's uniform underwent several changes. Prior to the merger in 2007, officers were required to maintain both summer and winter uniforms as well as authorized leather goods. Patrol officer badges were silver, while those for sergeants and above were gold. The uniform for all ranks was navy blue. When in dress uniform officers wore a peaked cap adorned with a cap badge.

See also

 List of law enforcement agencies in Indiana

References

Further reading
 Sulgrove, B.R. History of Indianapolis and Marion County, Indiana. Philadelphia: L.H. Everts & Co., 1884.
 Clipping file, Indianapolis-Marion County Public Library. S.v., Indianapolis Police Department.

Government of Indianapolis
Defunct law enforcement agencies of Indiana
Defunct municipal police departments of the United States
1854 establishments in Indiana
2006 disestablishments in Indiana